Hood-Strickland House, also known as the T. R. Hood House, is a historic home located at Smithfield, Johnston County, North Carolina.  It was built between 1887 and 1889, and is a two-story, three bay, "T"-shaped Italianate style frame dwelling.  It has a tall clipped gable roof, bracketed cornice, three sided bays, tall corbelled chimneys, segmental arched windows, and a decorative porch.

It was listed on the National Register of Historic Places in 1990.

References

Houses completed in 1889
Buildings and structures in Smithfield, North Carolina
Houses in Johnston County, North Carolina
Houses on the National Register of Historic Places in North Carolina
Italianate architecture in North Carolina
National Register of Historic Places in Johnston County, North Carolina